Tobechukwu Victor Okolie (born 5 December 1989), known as Peruzzi, is a Nigerian singer. He began recording music after working with Rodney malice at the age of seven. Though his signing to Davido's DMW was being disputed at some point, Peruzzi is a front member of the 30 Billion Gang (30BG), a record label including Blacktycoon, Tunegee, and B-Red. Peruzzi was featured on 2Baba's single 'Amaka'.

Career 
Peruzzi began his musical career with Golden Boy Records in 2016, before getting signed to Davido Music World in 2018. Peruzzi's 2018 single Majesty, off his Heartwork EP featured a video appearance by 2018 Big Brother Naija runner up Cee-c.  Prior to the release of Majesty, the singer had been maligned by many social media users in Nigeria who claimed the singer only shines on featured songs. He featured on Tu-Face's hit song "Amaka".

Discography

Singles 
 Amaka (2018)
 Champion Lover (2018)
 Majesty (2018)
 Did You (2018)
 Dina (2018)
 Run am (2018)
 Craze (2018)
 Sangbana (2018)
 Run am (2018)
 Try (2018)
 For your pocket (2018)
 Bleed (2019)
 Six 30 (with Davido) (2019)
 Nana (2019)
 The Box(2020)
Cinatti Love (2020)
Gunshot (2020)

Lagbaja (2020)
Isolova (2020)
Southy Love ft Fireboy DML (2020)
Somebody Baby ft Davido (2021)
Ready Ft Ace Berg Tm – Ready (2022) 
Peruzzi Ft Reekado Banks – Ozumba Mbadiwe (Refix Cover) 
Pressure ft Fireboy DML (2023)

Studio albums 
 Heartwork (2018)
 Huncho Vibez (2019) 
 Rum & Boogie (2021)

Accolades

References 

1989 births
Living people